Robert Dean Jackson (born March 16, 1940) is a former professional American football running back in the American Football League (AFL). He played four seasons for the San Diego Chargers (1962–1963), the Houston Oilers (1964, 1965), and the Oakland Raiders (1964).

Jackson also played for in the Continental Football League for three seasons for the Orange County Ramblers (1967-1968) and the Portland Loggers (1969). He won the league Most valuable player award for the 1967 season.

1940 births
Living people
American football running backs
Players of American football from Shreveport, Louisiana
Houston Oilers players
San Diego Chargers players
Oakland Raiders players
New Mexico State Aggies football players
Portland Loggers players
American Football League players